Patrick Wensink (born 1979) is an American author. 

His novel Broken Piano for President received increased publicity when the whiskey company Jack Daniel's Properties (a subsidiary of Brown–Forman) sent a politely worded cease-and-desist letter to the author asking that he change the design of his book cover, which closely resembled the label on Jack Daniel's whiskey. However, the whiskey company said it could be done upon the book's next reprinting and it would compensate the author if he chose to comply during the current run.

The controversy propelled Broken Piano for President to the #6 bestseller position and the #1 positions for satires on Amazon.com. In an article on Huffington Post, Wensink used this experience as a model for how books can gain publicity.

His other books include Sex Dungeon for Sale! and Black Hole Blues.

References

External links
Patrick Wensink Official Website
Chicago Center for Literacy and Photography Review of ''Broken Piano for President
Patrick Wensink celebrates book The Courier Journal May 31, 2012
Interview with Patrick Wensink
Review of Broken Piano for President The Fanzine April 5, 2012

1979 births
Living people
American male writers